Goodbye Charlie is a 1959 play written by George Axelrod. It opened on Broadway on December 16, 1959, and closed on March 19, 1960.

Settings
The show takes place at the beach home of Charlie Sorel, a few miles north of Malibu, California.

Productions
The show had five out of town tryouts in 1959, first Nixon Theatre in Pittsburgh, Pennsylvania, second was at the Shubert-Lafayette Theatre in Detroit, Michigan, third was at the Hanna Theatre in Cleveland, Ohio, fourth at Ford's Theatre in Baltimore, Maryland, and finally at the Walnut Street Theatre in Philadelphia, Pennsylvania. Later, this production transferred to Broadway at the Lyceum Theatre on December 16, 1959, directed by Axelrod, set design Oliver Smith and lighting design Peggy Clark. The cast included Frank Roberts (Greg Morris), Sydney Chaplin (George Tracy), Michelle Reiner (Franny Saltzman), Clinton Anderson (Irving), Dan Frazer (Mr. Shriber), Sarah Marshall (Rusty Mayerling), and Lauren Bacall (Charlie). Understudies included Jerome Preston Bates (Joe), Don Guillory (Spoon/Flip), Gretchen Hall (Kimber), and Zakiya Young (Cheryl, Taylor).

Awards and nominations

References

External links
Goodbye Charlie at the Internet Broadway database

1959 plays
Broadway plays
Plays adapted into films
Plays set in California